Héctor López (born 1929) is a Panamanian former baseball player.

Hector Lopez may also refer to:

Héctor López (athlete) (born 1952), Venezuelan Olympic athlete
Héctor López (boxer) (1967–2011), Olympic Mexican boxer
Héctor López (volleyball) (born 1971), Spanish former volleyball player
Héctor Mario López Fuentes (1930–2015), Guatemalan general
Hector Lopez, fictional character in seasons five and six (2003–2004) of U.S. sitcom Becker
Héctor Franco López (born 1963), Mexican politician
Hector Lopéz Alonso (born 1979), Spanish Paralympic swimmer